Pernštejnské Jestřabí is a municipality and village in Brno-Country District in the South Moravian Region of the Czech Republic. It has about 200 inhabitants.

Administrative parts
Villages of Husle, Jilmoví and Maňová are administrative parts of Pernštejnské Jestřabí.

References

Villages in Brno-Country District